Nicole Brandebusemeyer (born 9 October 1974 in Georgsmarienhütte, Lower Saxony) is a retired German football defender. She got 8 caps for the German national team between 1998 and 2000.

Brandebusemeyer played club football with FFC Brauweiler Pulheim in the Frauen-Bundesliga, and she helped the club reach the 2002–03 DFB-Pokal Frauen semi-finals.

References

 DFB profile

1974 births
Living people
People from Georgsmarienhütte
Footballers from Lower Saxony
German women's footballers
Germany women's international footballers
1999 FIFA Women's World Cup players
Footballers at the 2000 Summer Olympics
Olympic bronze medalists for Germany
Olympic medalists in football
Medalists at the 2000 Summer Olympics
Olympic footballers of Germany
Women's association football defenders